The men's 5000 metre relay in short track speed skating at the 2002 Winter Olympics took place on 13 and 23 February at the Salt Lake Ice Center.

Records
Prior to this competition, the existing world and Olympic records were as follows:

The following new Olympic records were set during this competition.

Results

Semifinals
The semifinals were held on 13 February. The top two teams in each semifinal qualified for the A final, while the third and fourth place teams advanced to the B Final.

Semifinal 1

Semifinal 2

Finals
The four qualifying teams competed in Final A, while three others raced in Final B.

Final A

Final B

References

Men's short track speed skating at the 2002 Winter Olympics